Nihan Kantarcı (born July 9, 1982 in Eskişehir, Turkey) is a Turkish sport shooter who competes in the trap and double trap events.

She began with shooting sport in 1996 at the Eskişehir Hunting and Shooting Sports Club. She is coached by Diego Gasperini in Bursa Büyükşehir Belediyespor. She serves as a teacher of physical education in a primary school at Gemlik, Bursa Province following her graduation from the Anadolu University.

She obtained in the women's junior category a bronze medal in the trap, and a gold medal in the double trap event at the 1999 European Shooting Championships held in Poussan, France. In 2002, she became silver medalist in the junior trap event at the European Championships in Lonato, Italy.

Nihan Kantarcı qualified to participate in the trap event at the 2012 Summer Olympics with her 6th place achieved at the 2011 ISSF World Cup 1 held in Sydney, Australia. She was the first ever Turkish female Olympic sport shooter along with Çiğdem Özyaman, who competed in the skeet event.

Achievements

References

1982 births
Sportspeople from Eskişehir
Anadolu University alumni
Turkish female sport shooters
Trap and double trap shooters
ISSF rifle shooters
Living people
Olympic shooters of Turkey
Shooters at the 2012 Summer Olympics
21st-century Turkish women